Olenecamptus nubilus is a species of beetle in the family Cerambycidae. It was described by Karl Jordan in 1904.

References

Dorcaschematini
Beetles described in 1904